Mount McLean is a  mountain summit located in British Columbia, Canada.

Description
Mount McLean is the highest peak of Mission Ridge, which is a subrange of the Coast Mountains. Precipitation runoff from the peak drains to Seton Lake and tributaries of the Fraser River. There are radio repeater towers on the summit.

Etymology
The mountain was named "McLean Mountain" in publications dating back to at least 1895. The toponym was officially adopted as Mount McLean on January 17, 1957, by the Geographical Names Board of Canada. The mountain is named after Donald McLean (1805–1864), a Scottish fur trader and explorer for the Hudson's Bay Company who later became a cattle rancher near Cache Creek.

Climate

Based on the Köppen climate classification, Mount McLean is located in a subarctic climate zone of western North America. Most weather fronts originate in the Pacific Ocean, and travel east toward the Coast Mountains where they are forced upward by the range (Orographic lift), causing them to drop their moisture in the form of rain or snowfall. As a result, the Coast Mountains experience high precipitation, especially during the winter months in the form of snowfall. Winter temperatures can drop below −20 °C with wind chill factors below −30 °C.

See also

 Geography of British Columbia

References

External links
 Weather: Mount McLean

Two-thousanders of British Columbia
Pacific Ranges
Lillooet Land District
Coast Mountains